Circumflex femoral artery may refer to:

Lateral circumflex femoral artery, an artery in the upper thigh
Medial circumflex femoral artery, an artery in the upper thigh that helps supply blood to the neck of the femur